Lingtren, is a mountain in the Mahalangur Himal area of Himalaya, about  distant in a direct line from Mount Everest. It lies on the international border between Nepal and the Tibet Autonomous Region of China and it was first climbed in 1935. A mountain nearby to the west was originally named Lingtrennup but is now more commonly called Xi Lingchain.

Geography 

A long chain of mountains extends generally somewhat north of west from Mount Everest whose west ridge descends to the col of Lho La before rising to Khumbutse. Bounded on the north by this chain of mountains is the Western Cwm in Nepal down which the Khumbu Glacier descends to the northwest over the Icefall before it turns sharply southwest. Lingtren lies at the apex of this right-angled bend. North of the mountain chain in Tibet the West Rongbuk Glacier flows east to join the main Rongbuk Glacier.

The gneiss has been intruded with many thinner granite sills.

The summit elevation is alternatively stated to be  and  using different elevation models.

Discovery 

Lingtren can easily be seen from inhabited villages in the Khumbu valley of Nepal but it may be that the first time it was seen by western explorers was from Tibet in 1921.
During the 1921 British Mount Everest reconnaissance expedition George Mallory and Guy Bullock were exploring the region to the north of Mount Everest hoping to find a route to the summit. Everest's west ridge did not seem promising so they tried to reach the watershed at some point to see what lay to the south. In doing this they discovered Lingtren (but did not climb it) and skirted its flanks to reach a col from where they were able to see the Western Cwm for the first time. However, the prospect of a  precipitous descent to the Khumbu Glacier and then an ascent of the Khumbu Icefall led them to reject this route.

Naming 

The peak now known as Lingtren is actually part of a complex formation extending to the north into the West Rongbuk Glacier (see 1921 expedition map). The name "Lingtren" now only refers to the highest summit, which is immediately to the north of the Khumbu Glacier.

Mallory and Bullock suggested names for the many topographical features they discovered and these were endorsed by the expedition and passed to Charles Bell, Britain's special ambassador to Lhasa, for approval. With reference to the whole Lingtren complex, they chose the name Lingtren as Tibetan for "subcontinent" or "island". By allusion, this word is also used to describe a lesser temple associated with a main temple.

There is another peak jutting into the West Rongbuk glacier but further to the west which proved to be an excellent location for observing and photographing the mountainous topography. This they named "Lingtrennup" (West Lingtren) and Mallory frequently referred to it by the nickname "Island Peak" because of its isolated location.

First ascent 

The 1935 British Mount Everest reconnaissance expedition again explored the region and on this occasion, during what Eric Shipton called "a veritable orgy of mountain climbing", Shipton and Leslie Vickery "Dan" Bryant climbed for the first time an outlying peak of Lingtren, Lingtrennup and then the main peak of Lingtren. Shipton was able to hold the rope and Bryant, who had retained his ice axe, was able to climb back.

Subsequent events 

When ascending the Khumbu valley at the start of the successful 1953 Everest expedition, John Hunt said that the glacier appeared as if it could only originate at an apparent valley head between Lingtren and Nuptse – the Icefall and Western Cwm were completely invisible around the sharp bend in the glacier. He described one summit of Lingtren as being "square and steep-ridged" and another to the east (he called it Lingtren Two) as "thin as a wafer at its top, looking incredibly fragile".

There has been no fully accepted record of the mountain having been climbed since 1935 and this would mean it has never been climbed from the Nepalese side. A planned South-African expedition on Lingtren was canceled  in 2013. In Hoger dan de Dhaulagiri,  claimed he had climbed Lingtren in 1993 saying he started in Nepal and then crossed into Tibet. This claim has, however, been discounted.

References

Further reading

External links

Mountains of Koshi Province
Mountains of Tibet
China–Nepal border
International mountains of Asia
Shigatse
Solukhumbu District
Himalayas
Six-thousanders of the Himalayas